Fahrettin Altun (born 11 September 1976, Stuttgart, Germany) is a Тurkish politician, researcher, academic, member of the Justice and Development Party and head of media and communications in the Turkish presidency.

Education and early life 
Altun studied Istanbul University Department of Sociology, graduating in 1998. He then studied at Mimar Sinan University and received his PhD from Istanbul University in 2006. His doctoral thesis was titled “A Comparative Analysis of Media Theories of McLuhan and Baudrillard”. Besides he has been involved in the Turkish government think tank Foundation for Political, Economic and Social Research (SETA).

Professional career 
He was Head of the Department of Communication at Istanbul Şehir University from 2008 to 2014 and was then a faculty member at Istanbul Medeniyet University from 2015 to 2017. Altun was chief editor of the magazine Kriter, and appeared as a commentator on TRT, a state owned television channel. He has written for Sabah, Daily Sabah and Akşam, and worked as an editor for Yöneliş and Küre publishing houses.

Political career 
Altun has risen to prominence within the Тurkish government quickly since leaving academia. According to Ahval, "Erdoğan frequently chooses Altun over his own spokesman Ibrahim Kalın to make critical statements and manage his social media output, the former academic is seen as the top man in the Presidency." He is seen as being close to former Economy minister and Erdogan's son in law Berat Albayrak and his family.

Altun strongly criticized French President Emmanuel Macron over his remarks on 'separatist Islam', following terrorist attacks in France. Altun said the remarks were "yet another example of a desperate European politician vying for relevance". Altun also said that European attitudes towards Muslims were reminiscent of the "demonization of the European Jewry in the 1920s."  Following a raid on the  pro-Kurdish Peoples' Democratic Party (HDP) office in Esenyurt, he equated the HDP with the Kurdistan Workers' Party (PKK).

References

1976 births
Living people
Mimar Sinan Fine Arts University alumni
Istanbul University alumni
Academic staff of Istanbul Şehir University
Turkish politicians
Academic staff of Istanbul Medeniyet University
Politicians from Stuttgart